The Dream, and Other Poems (1833) is a book of poems by Mrs George Lenox-Conyngham, also known as Elizabeth Emmet Lenox-Conyngham. It is her first known publication. Born Elizabeth Emmet, she was the only child of Robert Holmes (barrister) and Mary Anne Emmet.

Synopsis

The Dream, and Other Poems was published in 1833 in London by Edward Moxon, with 166 pages containing 24 poems, four of which were written by Lenox-Conyngham's mother. The collection is dedicated to her father, Robert Holmes, Esq. There are also three Italian Sonnets composed by Lenox-Conyngham, which do not have English translations, and two more Italian sonnets by other poets, Vincenzo da Filicaja (1642-1707) and De Coureil (1760-1822) translated by Lenox-Conyngham, who also translated 5 poems of F. Von Matthisson (1761-1831) from German into English.

There are 16 poems about death; 3 about war; 2 about humanity and exile; 1 on friendship; 1 on travel, and; 1 on femininity. 21 of these poems include allusions to Christianity.

The first poem, which is also entitled ‘The Dream’ is 64 pages long, with themes of death, romance, regret, grief, and the natural world. The protagonist, a nameless speaker described as the Hermit narrates his past romance through flashbacks to his long-lost friend, describing the woman he fell in love with in the past, and how her father did not approve of the Hermit as a suitor. The Hermit and lover escaped from her father and proceeded to marry. Afterwards the lovers on horseback are chased by unknown men in armour. The woman is in a deep, spell-like slumber. She immediately wakes from her sleep once the Hermit has slayed her father, breaking this spell. She does not recognise the corpse as her father's, so they continue on horseback. This murder riddles the Hermit speaker with grief and guilt; changing his appearance and destroying their romantic relationship. His lover realises that something is wrong, forcing the Hermit to confess that he has killed her father. This knowledge eventually leads to his lover's death, which explains the Hermit's current isolation. In the last stanza, he tells his friend that he wants the world to think he is dead, as both the Hermit and God, as well as the listening friend and audience, knows the full extent of his crimes.

Other known works
Hella: and Other Poems (1836)
Horae Poetica; Lyrical and Other Poems (1859)
Eiler and Helvig: A Danish Legend (1863)

References

1833 poems
English poetry collections